Xie Zhongbo (born 22 May 1983) is a former Chinese badminton player from Hunan and raised in Sichuan. After retired from the international tournament, he works as badminton coach in Sichuan.

Career 
A doubles specialist on the world circuit, Xie has regularly partnered Guo Zhendong in men's doubles and Zhang Yawen in mixed doubles over the past several years. Xie and Guo have won the Polish International (2004), the China Masters (2005), and the India Open (2008) together. They were quarter-finalists at 2007 BWF World Championships, and at the 2008 Beijing Olympics narrowly lost to the eventual gold medalists, Indonesia's Markis Kido and Hendra Setiawan, in the round of sixteen.

Xie has had greater success in mixed doubles. He and Zhang have captured eight titles internationally since the beginning of 2005. They were silver medalists at the 2005 IBF World Championships, losing the gold to Indonesia's Nova Widianto and Lilyana Natsir, and were bronze medalists at the 2007 edition of the tournament.

Xie is a member of China's world champion Thomas Cup (men's international) team. At 1.88 meters and solidly built, he is one of the biggest men currently playing the game at the world level.

He retired from the competitive international badminton in January 2010.

Achievements

BWF World Championships 
Mixed doubles

World Cup 
Men's doubles

Mixed doubles

Asian Games 
Mixed doubles

Asian Championships 
Mixed doubles

World Junior Championships 
Boys' doubles

Asian Junior Championships 
Boys' doubles

Mixed doubles

BWF Superseries 
The BWF Superseries, launched on 14 December 2006 and implemented in 2007, is a series of elite badminton tournaments, sanctioned by Badminton World Federation (BWF). BWF Superseries has two level such as Superseries and Superseries Premier. A season of Superseries features twelve tournaments around the world, which introduced since 2011, with successful players invited to the Superseries Finals held at the year end.

Men's doubles

Mixed doubles

  BWF Superseries Finals tournament
  BWF Superseries Premier tournament
  BWF Superseries tournament

BWF Grand Prix 
The BWF Grand Prix has two levels, the Grand Prix Gold and Grand Prix. It is a series of badminton tournaments, sanctioned by the Badminton World Federation (BWF) since 2007. The World Badminton Grand Prix has been sanctioned by the International Badminton Federation since 1983.

Men's doubles

Mixed doubles

  BWF Grand Prix Gold tournament
  BWF & IBF Grand Prix tournament

IBF International 
Men's doubles

Mixed doubles

References

External links 
 
 

1983 births
Living people
Badminton players from Hunan
Chinese male badminton players
Badminton players at the 2008 Summer Olympics
Olympic badminton players of China
Badminton players at the 2006 Asian Games
Asian Games gold medalists for China
Asian Games silver medalists for China
Asian Games medalists in badminton
Medalists at the 2006 Asian Games
Chinese badminton coaches